Coosan is a townland and suburb just north of Athlone, County Westmeath in Ireland. The suburb is surrounded on three sides by Lough Ree and on one side by Athlone.

Coosan attracts tourists over the summer months due to its location on the edge of Lough Ree. Coosan Lough, one of the "inner lakes" of Lough Ree, is a common fishing spot. The Lough Ree Yacht Club is located in the area.

Coosan is divided into three 'quarters': Castlequarter, Hillquarter and Meehanquarter.

The local Roman Catholic parish church, Queen of Peace church, was opened in 1973.

Notable people
 Ray Connellan, Australian rules footballer
 Dessie Dolan, Gaelic footballer
 Lisa Dwan, actress
 Robbie Henshaw, International rugby player
 Alan Sheehan, football player

References

Athlone